Duchamp is a French surname. Notable people with the surname include:

Alexina Duchamp (1906–1995), American art dealer
L. Timmel Duchamp (21st century), American author
Marcel Duchamp (1887–1968), French American artist
Pierre-Maurice-Raymond Duchamp (1876–1918), French sculptor
Suzanne Duchamp (1889–1963), French painter

French-language surnames